City Centre is one of the seventeen wards used to elect members of the City of Edinburgh Council. Established in 2007 along with the other wards, it elects four Councillors. As its name suggests, the ward's territory is based around a compact area in the centre of Edinburgh, including Calton Hill, the Canongate, Haymarket, Lauriston, the New Town, the Old Town, West Coates and the West End. A minor 2017 boundary change saw the loss of Abbeyhill and the gain of Tollcross and Dumbiedykes, but the overall population rose considerably and one further representative was added. In 2019, the ward had a population of 32,410.

Councillors

Election Results

2022 Election
2022 City of Edinburgh Council election

2017 Election
2017 City of Edinburgh Council election

2012 Election
2012 City of Edinburgh Council election

2007 Election
2007 City of Edinburgh Council election

2011 by-election
A by-election arose following the resignation of SNP councillor David Beckett on 9 June 2011. The seat was held by the SNP's Alasdair Rankin on 18 August 2011.

References

External links
Listed Buildings in City Centre Ward, City of Edinburgh at British Listed Buildings

Wards of Edinburgh
Old Town, Edinburgh
New Town, Edinburgh